Rachid Soulaimani (born 21 November 1982, Oued Zam) is a Moroccan footballer who plays as a right back for Moroccan Botola club Raja Casablanca.

External links
 

1982 births
Living people
Moroccan footballers
People from Oued Zem
Raja CA players
Association football fullbacks
Morocco international footballers